Lt. General John Joseph Cusick (born March 11, 1942) is a retired lieutenant general of the United States Army. Cusick served as the 42nd Quartermaster General of the United States Army from July 1991 until August 1993.

Cusick began his military career in May 1964, when he was commissioned as a second lieutenant from the Army ROTC at the University of Scranton. He received a bachelor's degree in American history from the University of Scranton. He also obtained a master's degree in American history from the University of Nebraska–Lincoln and a master's in management from Webster University in Missouri. He retired honorably from the U.S. Army on May 31, 1998.

References

1942 births
Living people
People from Scranton, Pennsylvania
University of Scranton alumni
United States Army personnel of the Vietnam War
University of Nebraska–Lincoln alumni
Webster University alumni
Recipients of the Legion of Merit
United States Army generals
Quartermasters General of the United States Army
Recipients of the Defense Superior Service Medal
Recipients of the Distinguished Service Medal (US Army)
Military personnel from Pennsylvania